Evelina Pirjo Jovanka Duljan (born 12 May 2003) is a Swedish professional footballer who plays as a defender for Serie A club Juventus.

Club career 
On 12 August 2022, Duljan joined Serie A club Juventus.

Personal life
Duljan is of Nigerian descent.

References

External links
 

2003 births
Living people
People from Kristianstad Municipality
Footballers from Skåne County
Swedish women's footballers
Women's association football defenders
Kristianstads DFF players
Växjö DFF players
Juventus F.C. (women) players
Damallsvenskan players
Serie A (women's football) players
Sweden women's youth international footballers
Swedish expatriate women's footballers
Swedish expatriate sportspeople in Italy
Expatriate women's footballers in Italy
Swedish people of Nigerian descent
Swedish sportspeople of African descent